In chemistry, a Lewis conjugate may refer to:

 The conjugate acid of a Lewis base or the conjugate base of a Lewis acid
 A molecule having a conjugated system of bonds in its Lewis structure